Anurag Mathur (अनुराग माथुर) is an Indian author and journalist mainly known for his 1991 novel The Inscrutable Americans. He was educated at the Scindia School (Gwalior, India). He earned his bachelor's degree from St. Stephen's College, Delhi, and his master's from the University of Tulsa.

Bibliography
The Inscrutable Americans
 Making the Minister Smile
Are All Women Leg-Spinners asked the Stephanian, later republished as The Department of Denials
Scenes From an Executive Life
22 Days in India
A Life Lived Later - Poems
Popat Lal Bhindi
The country is going to the dogs (2014)

References

Living people
University of Tulsa alumni
Indian male novelists
Indian male journalists
St. Stephen's College, Delhi alumni
Place of birth missing (living people)
Date of birth missing (living people)
Year of birth missing (living people)